Shukra may refer to:

 Shukra, an ancient lineage of sages who counselled Asuras in Vedic history
 Sukra, alternate spelling of Shukra, the Sanskrit name for Venus
 Sukra, a Montserratian spirit or ghost